The 2007 European Judo Championships were the 18th edition of the European Judo Championships, and were held in Belgrade, Serbia from 6 April to 8 April 2007.

Medal overview

Men

Women

Medal table

Results overview

Men

60 kg

66 kg

73 kg

81 kg

90 kg

100 kg

+100 kg

Women

48 kg

52 kg

57 kg

63 kg

70 kg

78 kg

+78 kg

References
 EJU Live Results System (EJU)

External links
 
 Video footage of Finals and Bronze finals (Judovision)

 
European Championships
Judo Championships
European Judo Championships
International sports competitions in Belgrade
2000s in Belgrade
Judo competitions in Serbia
April 2007 sports events in Europe